The 2004 WGC-NEC Invitational was a golf tournament that was contested from August 19–22, 2004 over the South Course at Firestone Country Club in Akron, Ohio. It was the sixth WGC-NEC Invitational tournament, and the second of four World Golf Championships events held in 2004.

Stewart Cink won the tournament to capture his first World Golf Championships title.

Round summaries

First round

Second round

Third round

Final round

External links
Full results

WGC Invitational
WGC-NEC Invitational
WGC-NEC Invitational
WGC-NEC Invitational